The Young Savages is a 1961 American crime drama film directed by John Frankenheimer and starring Burt Lancaster. It was written by Edward Anhalt from a novel by Evan Hunter. The supporting cast includes Dina Merrill, Shelley Winters, and Edward Andrews, and The Young Savages was the first film featuring Telly Savalas, who plays a police detective, foreshadowing his later role as Kojak. Often categorized as a "thinking man's movie", it has received mixed reviews. Aspects of the film are inspired by the real-life Salvador Agron case.

Plot 
Two Italian-American greasers, Danny diPace and Anthony "Batman" Aposto (Neil Nephew), and the Irish-American Arthur Reardon are members of a street gang named the Thunderbirds in New York City in East Harlem. They have an ongoing turf war with a Puerto Rican gang called the Horsemen. The three Thunderbirds unleash a knife attack on Roberto Escalante, a blind member of the Horsemen and stab him to death. They are caught and arrested, and during questioning by the police, assistant district attorney Hank Bell  discovers one of the boys is the son of Mary diPace, an ex-girlfriend.

Back at the office of the district attorney Dan Cole, Bell admits he knows the mother of one of the suspects in the killing. Despite objections, he is not taken off the case and admits that he grew up in the same neighborhood. In a conversation with his wife Karin, Bell admits that his father changed his name from Bellini (Belani in the book) to Bell because he wanted to conceal his background and where he grew up, a deception Bell had found advantageous in pursuing his career and in the opportunity to marry Karen, a Vassar girl. At the funeral for Escalante, Bell is confronted by his ex-lover who tells him that her son promised he would never join a gang. Bell then sets out to find the facts about the killing, meeting one by one with all the families and gang members involved. He learns not only the intricacies of the case, but is shocked at his own capacity to kill when he is attacked by a gang—most likely members of the Thunderbirds, given how some members watched over Escalate's funeral, likely spying on it—making him realize his hard-won character in the school of hard knocks is not immune to these forces. From a different angle, illustrating the limitations of a privileged education and upbringing, his wife finds her idealistic empathy for those caught in a web of circumstance is challenged when she is attacked by gang members in an elevator.

The drama evolves to consider many aspects of the crime: gangs, poverty, ethnic bias, parental incapacity to deal with forces far beyond their control, and politics. The three boys tried for the murder illustrate how personal qualities of morality, mental capacity, conformity, and psychosis fit into a squalid ethnically diverse setting compartmentalized by demeaning stereotypical beliefs. The milieu in which all life is on trial, including not only the perpetrators' surroundings, but the failure of larger society to take much interest in the underlying issues.

When the trial concludes with different sentences for each boy, tailored to their individual natures, Escalante's mother asks Bell if justice had been served. He answers unhappily that a great many people bear responsibility for her son's death.

Cast

See also 
 List of American films of 1961
 List of hood films

References

External links 
 
 
 
  This link provides some details of the filming and the actors.
 

1961 crime drama films
1961 films
American black-and-white films
American crime drama films
1960s English-language films
Films about juvenile delinquency
Films about race and ethnicity
Films based on American novels
Films directed by John Frankenheimer
Films produced by Burt Lancaster
Films produced by Harold Hecht
Films scored by David Amram
Films set in New York City
Films shot in New York City
Films with screenplays by Edward Anhalt
Norma Productions films
United Artists films
1960s American films